Stig Arne Holger Östling (born 31 December 1948) is a Swedish former ice hockey defenceman. He played for Mora IK from 1966 to 1970 and for Brynäs IF from 1970 to 1984 (winning the Swedish championship in 1971, 1972, 1976, 1977 and 1980).

He competed as a member of the Sweden men's national ice hockey team at the 1972 Winter Olympics held in Japan.

He was named Swedish Player of the Year (the Golden Puck) in 1974–75.

References

External links 

1948 births
Living people
Brynäs IF players
Ice hockey players at the 1972 Winter Olympics
Olympic ice hockey players of Sweden
Swedish ice hockey defencemen